Sergio González Martínez (born 14 May 1997) is a Spanish footballer who plays for CD Tenerife as a central defender.

Club career
Born in Cartagena, Murcia, González was a Cádiz CF youth graduate. He made his senior debut with the reserves on 17 May 2015, starting in a 2–3 Tercera División away loss against CD Mairena.

González made his first team debut on 15 May 2016, starting in a 1–0 away win against Real Jaén in the Segunda División B. His professional debut occurred on 11 January 2018 as he started in a 1–2 loss at Sevilla FC in the season's Copa del Rey.

On 9 July 2018, González signed a new three-year contract. He made his Segunda División debut on 23 February 2019, playing 12 minutes in a 3–2 away win against Gimnàstic de Tarragona.

On 21 January 2020, González renewed his contract with the Amarillos until 2023, and finished the campaign with 17 appearances for the first team as his side achieved promotion to La Liga. Definitely promoted to the main squad for 2020–21, he made his debut in the top tier on 12 September by starting in a 0–2 home loss against CA Osasuna.

Shortly after his top tier debut, however, González was separated from the first team squad, being unable to play for Cádiz. On 12 January 2021, he moved on loan to second division side CD Tenerife until the end of the campaign.

On 21 July 2021, González signed a permanent three-year contract with Tenerife.

References

External links

Sergio González profile at Cadistas1910 

1997 births
Living people
Sportspeople from Cartagena, Spain
Spanish footballers
Footballers from the Region of Murcia
Association football defenders
La Liga players
Segunda División players
Segunda División B players
Tercera División players
Cádiz CF B players
Cádiz CF players
CD Tenerife players